Eloxochitlán is a municipality located in the southeastern part of the state of Puebla in Mexico. In the town there is a high rate of indigenous population: about 44%.

Geography
Eloxochitlán is located southeast of the Puebla state. Colinda to the north with the state of Veracruz, south, with Zoquitlán, east Tlacotepec de Porfirio Díaz and west Ajalpan. It covers an area of 109 square kilometers.

Demography
Their marginalization index is 2.260 which places it in the second municipality with greater marginalization of the state. It is estimated that more than 9 million inhabitants speak an indigenous language and that 44% of the population is indigenous.

Economy
The municipality is mainly engaged in agriculture focusing on production of grains such as corn, beans and coffee. The second main activity of the municipality is raising livestock mainly cattle, pigs, goats, sheep, horses and poultry, mainly chicken.

Culture
90% of the population is Catholic. The supervisory celebration is held in honor of San Miguel Archangel at the end of September each year.

Bibliography
 State Center of Municipal Development, Semblanza of the 7 Socioeconomic Regions of the State of Puebla, Mexico, 1991.
 Government of the State of Puebla, State Population Council, 1995 Spatial Distribution of Population, Mexico.
 Government of the State of Puebla, State Population Council, Synthesis Sociodemographic 1970–1992, Mexico.
 Government of the State of Puebla, Ministry of Education, Statistics courses start 1996–1997.
 Government of the State of Puebla, Interior Ministry, Municipalities of Puebla, Mexico, 1988.
 National Institute of Statistics, Geography and Informatics, Statistical Yearbook of the State of Puebla, Mexico, 1996.
 National Institute of Statistics, Geography and Informatics, Census of Population and Housing 1995, Final Results, Puebla.
 National Institute of Statistics, Geography and Informatics, XI General Census of Population and Housing, Mexico, 1990.

Municipalities of Puebla